Ivan Aleksandrovich Belikov (born 4 December 1996) is a Russian football player.

Club career
He made his debut in the Russian Professional Football League for FC Lokomotiv Liski on 10 April 2016 in a game against FC Arsenal-2 Tula.

He made his Russian Football National League debut for FC Khimki on 15 July 2017 in a game against FC Kuban Krasnodar.

References

External links
 Profile by Russian Professional Football League
 
 Ivan Belikov at CFU

1996 births
Footballers from Moscow
Living people
Russian footballers
Russia youth international footballers
Association football midfielders
Russian expatriate footballers
Expatriate footballers in Belarus
FC Naftan Novopolotsk players
PFC CSKA Moscow players
FC Amkar Perm players
FC Khimki players
FC Sakhalin Yuzhno-Sakhalinsk players
FC Fakel Voronezh players
FC Khimik-Arsenal players